Anton Chichulin (born 27 November 1984) is a Kazakh former football midfielder.

Career

Club
In January 2015, Chichulin returned to Kazakhstan, signing with FC Atyrau. A year later, in February 2016, Chichulin signed for FC Okzhetpes. On 30 September 2016, Chichulin had his contract with FC Okzhetpes terminated by mutual consent.

International
Chichulin has made 24 appearances for the Kazakhstan national football team.

References

External links

1984 births
Living people
Kazakhstani footballers
Association football midfielders
Kazakhstan international footballers
FC Zhenis Astana players
FC Aktobe players
FC Irtysh Pavlodar players
Giresunspor footballers
FC Atyrau players
Kazakhstani expatriate footballers
Kazakhstani expatriate sportspeople in Turkey
Kazakhstan Premier League players
TFF First League players